The Coudersport Giants were a minor league baseball team based in Coudersport, Pennsylvania. In 1905, the Giants played as members of the Class D level Interstate League, winning the league championship in their final season of play. Previously hosting the 1904 Coudersport minor league team of the independent Southern Tier League, Coudersport played home minor league games at Morgan Park.

History
In 1904, Coudersport began minor league play as members of the independent Southern Tier League. The team had no official nickname, common in the era, as Charles Eichelberger managed the Coudersport team. Playing with Coudersport in the league were the Addison White Sox, Corning White Ponies, Elmira, Hornellsville Maple Cities, Penn Yan Grape Pickers and Wellsville Oil Drillers teams. The 1904 official Southern Tier League standings and statistics are unknown, but newspaper accounts had the Coudersport team in last place with a 9–19 record on August 21, 1904.

In 1905, Coudersport continued minor league play, with the Coudersport "Giants" becoming members of the six–team Class D level Interstate League. The Bradford Drillers, Erie Fishermen, Jamestown Hill Climbers, Kane Mountaineers and Olean Refiners joined the Giants in beginning league play of April 25, 1905. Local newspapers used the "Giants" nickname for the team.

The Coudersport Giants won the 1905 Interstate League championship. The Giants ended the 1905 season with a record of 59–38, finishing 1st in the Interstate League standings. With Harry Knight and John Lawley serving as managers, Coudersport finished 1.0 game ahead of the 2nd place Erie Fisherman (58–39). The Olean Refiners (54–50), Bradford Drillers (46–54), Kane Mountaineers (40–56) and Jamestown Hill Climbers/DuBois Miners (40–60) followed in the standings.

Future major league players Rube Kroh and Herbie Moran played for the Coudersport Giants. Moran was a Coudersport native, playing his first season of professional baseball.

The Interstate League continued play in 1906, when it expanded to eight teams, but did not continue the franchise in Coudersport. Coudersport, Pennsylvania has not hosted another minor league team.

The ballpark
Coudersport hosted home minor league games at Mitchell Park. Still in use today as a public park, Mitchell Park is located on Park Avenue.

Timeline

Year–by–year record

Notable alumni

Rube Kroh (1905)
Herbie Moran (1904-1905)

See also
Coudersport Giants players

References

External links
Coudersport - Baseball Reference

Defunct minor league baseball teams
Baseball teams established in 1905
Baseball teams disestablished in 1905
Defunct baseball teams in Pennsylvania
Defunct Interstate League teams
Potter County, Pennsylvania